Reyes Armando Moronta (born January 6, 1993) is a Dominican professional baseball pitcher in the Texas Rangers organization. Moronta signed with the San Francisco Giants as an international free agent in 2010. He has played in Major League Baseball (MLB) for the Giants, Los Angeles Dodgers and Arizona Diamondbacks.

Early life
Moronta was born to Francisco and Ivonne Moronta in Santiago in the Dominican Republic, the youngest of five children. His father was a truck driver, and his mother rolled cigars at a local factory. He grew up in the 700-person rural town of Quinigua, 5 miles north of Santiago. For high school he attended Milagros Hernández Lyceum in Villa González.

Professional career

San Francisco Giants

Minor leagues
Moronta signed with the San Francisco Giants as an international free agent in September 2010 at 17 years of age for $15,000. He made his professional debut in 2011 with the Dominican Summer League Giants. He played for the Arizona League Giants in 2012.

He played as a starting pitcher with the Salem-Keizer Volcanoes in 2013, Arizona League Giants in 2014, and Augusta GreenJackets in 2015.

He played for the San Jose Giants in 2016, for whom he was 0-3 with 14 saves (3rd in the California League) and a 2.59 ERA in 60 games (leading the league) in which he pitched 59 innings and struck out 93 batters (14.2 strikeouts per nine innings pitched; leading the league). His fastball reached as high as 100 mph. He was a mid-season All Star, and an MiLB organization All Star. The Giants added him to their 40-man roster after the 2016 season.

Major Leagues
Moronta was called up to the Major Leagues on May 10, 2017. During the 2017 season, Moronta pitched in 7 games for the Giants, recording 11 strikeouts in 6 innings pitched (14.8 per 9 innings). In the minors, he pitched for three teams and was 3-1 with five saves and a 2.92 ERA, as in 34 relief appearances he pitched 37 innings and struck out 47 batters (11.4 per 9 innings).

In 2018 for the Giants he was 5-2 with one save and a 2.49 ERA, as in 69 relief appearances (4th among NL rookies, and the most by a Giants rookie since Elias Sosa in 1973) he pitched 65 innings and struck out 79 batters (10.9 per 9 innings). He threw his four-seam fastball at an average 97.6 mph, and opposing batters hit .154 overall, .142 against his slider, and .132 as right-handed batters. In one stretch, he tied a Major League streak with 12 straight appearances without allowing a hit. He established the Giants record for fewest hits per 9 innings (4.71), with a minimum of 50 innings pitched.

In 2019 for the Giants he was 3-7 with a 2.86 ERA, as in 56 relief appearances he pitched 56.2 innings and struck out 70 batters (11.1 per 9 innings). He threw his four-seam fastball at an average 97.5 mph, and batters hit .123 against his slider. In September 2019 he underwent surgery to repair a torn labrum in his right shoulder, and was expected to miss nine to eleven months. He missed the 2020 season as a result.

On May 17, 2021, Moronta was placed on the 60-day injured list with a mild sprained ligament in his elbow. On September 21, Moronta was outrighted off of the 40-man roster and assigned to the Triple-A Sacramento River Cats. On October 14, Moronta elected free agency.

Los Angeles Dodgers
On February 19, 2022, Moronta signed with the Diablos Rojos del México of the Mexican League. However, on March 12, 2022, prior to the start of the Mexican League season, Moronta signed a minor league contract with the Los Angeles Dodgers that included an invitation to spring training. He began the season in Triple-A with the Oklahoma City Dodgers but was added to the major league roster on April 24.

Moronta appeared in 22 games in the majors for Los Angeles, with a 4.18 ERA before he was designated for assignment on August 20.

Arizona Diamondbacks
On August 22, 2022, Moronta was claimed off waivers by the Arizona Diamondbacks. Moronta made 17 appearances for Arizona to close out the year. In 14.0 innings pitched, he logged a 2-2 record and 4.50 ERA while striking out 11 and collecting two saves. He was non-tendered and became a free agent on November 18.

Texas Rangers
On January 25, 2023, Moronta signed a minor league contract with the Texas Rangers organization.

References

External links

1993 births
Living people
Arizona Diamondbacks players
Arizona League Giants players
Augusta GreenJackets players
Dominican Republic expatriate baseball players in the United States
Dominican Summer League Giants players
Major League Baseball players from the Dominican Republic
Major League Baseball pitchers
Leones del Escogido players
Los Angeles Dodgers players
Oklahoma City Dodgers players
Richmond Flying Squirrels players
Sacramento River Cats players
Salem-Keizer Volcanoes players
San Francisco Giants players
San Jose Giants players